David Darcy (11 August 19431 August 2020) was an Australian rules footballer who played for Footscray in the Victorian Football League (VFL) during the 1960s. Darcy also played for and coached South Adelaide in the South Australian National Football League (SANFL).

Career

Darcy was recruited from Sunshine YCW, a junior club that played in the CYMS competition.

He started his career at half forward but in his second season moved to defence where he excelled.  As a key position defender he went on to represent Victoria on four occasions.

Darcy chose the South Adelaide Panthers but Footscray initially refused to clear him to play. Once the approval came through, he had an outstanding year with the Panthers where he would finish third in the Magarey Medal from only 11 games.

Darcy transferred back to Melbourne in 1968 and returned to play with Footscray until 1971. 

On his return to the Panthers he was selected as captain-coach for the 1972 and 1973 seasons, and became outright coach in 1974.

Darcy was the father of former  player and current football commentator Luke Darcy and the grandfather of current Western Bulldogs player Sam Darcy.

References

External links
 
 

1943 births
2020 deaths
Australian rules footballers from Victoria (Australia)
Western Bulldogs players
South Adelaide Football Club players
South Adelaide Football Club coaches
Sunshine Football Club (WRFL) players